James Hogan (1937 – 7 March 2016) was an Irish hurler who played for club sides Adare, Sarsfields and Claughaun. He was a member of the Limerick senior hurling team at various times over a 15-year period, during which time he usually lined out as a goalkeeper.

Career

Hogan first appeared as a 14-year-old member of the Adare minor team in 1951. He simultaneously lined out with the Adare CBS team and was a member of the school team that was beaten by De La Salle College Waterford in the Dean Ryan Cup final in 1953. Hogan's working life brought him to Cork and it was with the Sarsfields club there that he won a County Championship title in 1957. He also lined out as a Gaelic footballer with Lees and narrowly missed out on completing the double. Hogan returned to Limerick and joined the Claughaun club, with whom he won further County Championship titles. He first appeared for the Limerick senior hurling team in the Rose Cup final in 1958 and quickly established himself as a mainstay of the team. Hogan was sub-goalkeeper on the Limerick team that beat Kilkenny in the 1973 All-Ireland final. His other honours include Munster Championship and National Hurling League medals, while he also earned selection with Munster.

Death

Hogan died at University Hospital Limerick on 7 March 2016.

Honours

Sarsfields
Cork Senior Hurling Championship: 1957

Claughaun
Limerick Senior Hurling Championship: 1958, 1968, 1971

Cork
All-Ireland Senior Hurling Championship: 1973
Munster Senior Hurling Championship: 1973
National Hurling League: 1970-71

References

1937 births
2016 deaths
Adare hurlers
Sarsfields (Cork) hurlers
Lees Gaelic footballers
Claughaun hurlers
Limerick inter-county hurlers
Munster inter-provincial hurlers
Hurling goalkeepers